Liu Zhang may refer to:

 Liu Zhang (prince) 劉章, Western Han imperial clan member involved in overthrowing the Lü clan during the Lü Clan Disturbance
 Liu Zhang (warlord) 劉璋, warlord in the late Eastern Han Dynasty, who controlled Yi Province
  (劉章, c. 1095–1177), writer

(NB: The 7th son of Liu Bang, Liu Chang (刘长) does not belong in this list, since the accepted reading of the given name in this case is not Zhang)